On 22 August 1972 a bomb planted by the Provisional Irish Republican Army, an Irish republican paramilitary group, detonated prematurely at a customs office in Newry. Three IRA members killed six civilians and themselves in the explosion. The event was one of the bloodiest of 1972, the deadliest year of The Troubles.

Background 
Since 1971, the Provisional IRA had been waging a campaign to end British rule in Northern Ireland. Gun and bomb attacks became daily occurrences in the province as the campaign continued. In January 1972, soldiers from the Parachute Regiment shot dead 14 civil rights protesters in Derry, in an event later known as Bloody Sunday. The attack enraged the nationalist community and as a result support for the IRA surged. In the following months the ferocity of the conflict, and as a result number of casualties, rose dramatically.

Military installations and civilian businesses were targeted frequently. Civilians often fell victim to the IRA's attacks. This most prominently occurred on Bloody Friday, when at least 20 bombs planted by the IRA exploded in quick succession in Belfast. As a result of the bombs, 9 people were killed and another 130 injured.

Newry, a mainly nationalist town near the Irish border, had a lot of IRA supporters. Attacks had already taken place in the town, leading to seven people - three civilians, two police officers, one British soldier and one IRA volunteer - being killed.

Attack 
Three IRA members walked into the office with a bomb. It exploded prematurely, killing all of them, two lorry drivers and four customs staff.

See also
List of terrorist incidents, 1972

References

1972 in Northern Ireland
1972 murders in the United Kingdom
1970s in County Armagh
20th-century mass murder in Northern Ireland
Attacks on buildings and structures in 1972
Attacks on buildings and structures in Northern Ireland
August 1972 crimes
August 1972 events in the United Kingdom
Customs bombing
Improvised explosive device bombings in 1972
Mass murder in 1972
Mass murder in County Armagh
Provisional IRA bombings in Northern Ireland
Terrorist incidents in County Armagh
Terrorist incidents in the United Kingdom in 1972
1972 crimes in Ireland
1970s murders in Northern Ireland
The Troubles in County Armagh
Building bombings in Northern Ireland